The 1954 Ohio gubernatorial election was held on November 2, 1954. Incumbent Democrat Frank Lausche defeated Republican nominee Jim Rhodes with 54.10% of the vote. As of 2021, this is the last gubernatorial election where Van Wert County voted Democratic.

Primary elections
Primary elections were held on May 4, 1954.

Democratic primary

Candidates
Frank Lausche, incumbent Governor

Results

Republican primary

Candidates
Jim Rhodes, Ohio State Auditor

Results

General election

Candidates
Frank Lausche, Democratic
Jim Rhodes, Republican

Results

References

1954
Ohio
Gubernatorial
November 1954 events in the United States